In population genetics, Ewens's sampling formula, describes the probabilities associated with counts of how many different alleles are observed a given number of times in the sample.

Definition
Ewens's sampling formula, introduced by Warren Ewens, states that under certain conditions (specified below), if a random sample of n gametes is taken from a population and classified according to the gene at a particular locus then the probability that there are a1 alleles represented once in the sample, and a2 alleles represented twice, and so on, is

for some positive number θ representing the population mutation rate, whenever  is a sequence of nonnegative integers such that

The phrase "under certain conditions" used above is made precise by the following assumptions:
 The sample size n is small by comparison to the size of the whole population; and
 The population is in statistical equilibrium under mutation and genetic drift and the role of selection at the locus in question is negligible; and
 Every mutant allele is novel. 

This is a probability distribution on the set of all partitions of the integer n. Among probabilists and statisticians it is often called the multivariate Ewens distribution.

Mathematical properties
When θ = 0, the probability is 1 that all n genes are the same. When θ = 1, then the distribution is precisely that of the integer partition induced by a uniformly distributed random permutation. As θ → ∞, the probability that no two of the n genes are the same approaches 1.

This family of probability distributions enjoys the property that if after the sample of n is taken, m of the n gametes are chosen without replacement, then the resulting probability distribution on the set of all partitions of the smaller integer m is just what the formula above would give if m were put in place of n.

The Ewens distribution arises naturally from the Chinese restaurant process.

See also
 Chinese restaurant table distribution
 Coalescent theory
 Unified neutral theory of biodiversity
 Biomathematics

Notes
 Warren Ewens, "The sampling theory of selectively neutral alleles", Theoretical Population Biology, volume 3, pages 87–112, 1972.
 H. Crane. (2016) "The Ubiquitous Ewens Sampling Formula", Statistical Science, 31:1 (Feb 2016). This article introduces a series of seven articles about Ewens Sampling in a special issue of the journal.
 J.F.C. Kingman, "Random partitions in population genetics", Proceedings of the Royal Society of London, Series B, Mathematical and Physical Sciences, volume 361, number 1704, 1978.
 S. Tavare and W. J. Ewens, "The Multivariate Ewens distribution." (1997, Chapter 41 from the reference below).
 N.L. Johnson, S. Kotz, and N. Balakrishnan (1997) Discrete Multivariate Distributions, Wiley. .

Theory of probability distributions
Population genetics
Discrete distributions